Vanessa Moesta (born 16 December 1992) is a Congolese handball player for Angoulême Charente Handball and the DR Congo national team.

She represented DR Congo at the 2019 World Women's Handball Championship.

References

1992 births
Living people
Democratic Republic of the Congo female handball players
Expatriate handball players
Democratic Republic of the Congo expatriate sportspeople in France